The Lithuanian Farmers and Greens Union (LVŽS) is a green-conservative and agrarian political party in Lithuania led by Ramūnas Karbauskis.

Following the 2020 parliamentary election, the LVŽS has been in opposition to the Šimonytė Cabinet. The party's two MEPs sit in the Greens–European Free Alliance group in the European Parliament. Founded in 2001 as the Lithuanian Peasant Popular Union, (LVLS), the party's symbol since 2012 has been the white stork.

History

Foundation and participation in the Social Democratic Party-led governments (2001–2008)
In December 2001, electoral alliance between the Lithuanian Peasants Party (Lietuvos valstiečių partija) and the New Democratic Party known as the "" (or VNDS), which translates to the Peasants and New Democratic Party Union or Union of Peasants and New Democratic Parties was formed. In 2002–03 Lithuanian presidential election party's chairman Kazimira Prunskienė came with 5.04 per cent of the votes in the first round and saved its deposit. In the second round, she endorsed Rolandas Paksas of the Liberal Democratic Party, who won the election.

In 2004 presidential election (after Rolandas Packsas impeachement), Kazimira Prunskienė narrowly came to the second position (21.25 per cent), but she was defeated in the second round (although, after endorsement of Rolandas Paksas). In 2004 European Parliament election, the party got 7.41 per cent of the votes and won one seat by Gintaras Didžiokas. He joined the Union for Europe of the Nations. In Seimas election later tahat same year, the party got 6.6 per cent of the votes. The Labour Party joined forces with Peasants and New Democratic Party Union and invited the Social Democratic Party of Lithuania to join. Brazauskas initially ruled out a coalition with Labour, but eventually Social Democrats and New Union (Social Liberals) joined forces with the Labour Party and the Peasants, with Brazauskas as the Prime Minister.

In February 2006, the Peasants and New Democratic Party Union led by Lithuanian politician Kazimiera Prunskienė chose to rename itself Lithuanian Peasant Popular Union (after the pre-war Lithuanian Popular Peasants' Union). The party itself was main force in the Social Democratic Party-led governments.

In 2008 parliamentary election the party felt below 5 per cent threshold and was left with three members, who were elected in single-member constituencies.

Opposition and leading force in the government (2009–2020)
In 2009 Kazimira Prunskienė left the party and founded the party of her own (Lithuanian People's Party). Although the party was minor one, it gained some influence in 2010, when it supported the Homeland Union-led government. The Lithuanian Peasants Popular Union changed its name to the Lithuanian Peasants and Greens Union in January 2012.

The party emerged as a dark horse in the electoral race in the spring of 2016. The rise of support was attributed to the popularity of Karbauskis, who had been active in campaigning against alcohol, and their lack of involvement in political scandals. LVŽS was further boosted by the announcement that Saulius Skvernelis, a Minister of Interior in Butkevičius Cabinet and one of the most popular politicians in Lithuania, would head the party's electoral list in the elections, without joining the party.

After successful performance in the 2016 parliamentary elections, a clarification about its English name format was issued, changing it to Lithuanian Farmers and Greens Union. Also, after these election the Lithuanian Farmers and Greens Union became one of the main three political parties in Lithuania (along with the Homeland Union and the Social Democratic Party) at the time.

After these elections, various pundits claimed that the Lithuanian Farmers and Greens Union could form a coalition with the Homeland Union, but Ramūnas Karbauskis proposed wide coalition between the aforementioned parties and the Social Democratic Party. The Homeland Union's leader Gabrielius Landsbergis himself proposed a coalition between the Homeland Union, the Lithuanian Farmers and Greens Union and the Liberal Movement, although both Ramūnas Karbauskis and the Liberal Movement's leader Eugenijus Gentvilas turned down this offer. Eventually, a coalition was formed between the Lithuanian Farmers and Greens Union and the Social Democratic Party of Lithuania, which lasted until the autumn of 2017.

The party's support gradually declined by 2018 (e. g. in 2019 European Parliament election the party got 11.92 per cent of the votes), although due to the rally 'round the flag effect (caused by the COVID-19 pandemic), its support rebounded. In the 2020 parliamentary election the party won 18.07 per cent of the vote and 32 parliamentary seats. The party has been in opposition since 2020.

Again in opposition (from 2020)

After the elections, Ramūnas Karbauskis resigned from his parliamentary seat. After the electoral loss the party started to support (along with the Labour Party) various radical movements on the political fringes (e. g. Families' Defense March). This position caused disagreements within party and its parliamentary group.

Disagreements had forced a split in the parliamentary group in late summer and early autumn of 2021 with former Prime Minister Saulius Skvernelis joining the newly established Democrats' parliamentary group "For Lithuania" (although this split  was speculated by the pundits as early as March 2021). Due to this and the Social Democratic Party's position not to support the opposition coalition, the party lost the opposition leader's position. By the end of 2021, the party started losing members in municipalities' districts (e. g. Lazdijai district municipality mayor Ausma Miškinienė left it along with the almost all LVŽS members in the area).

Electoral results

Seimas

European Parliament

Current Members of the Seimas

Name
2001 – Dec 2005: Peasants and New Democratic Party Union or Union of Peasants and New Democratic Parties
Dec 2005 – Jan 2012: Lithuanian Peasant Popular Union (Lietuvos valstiečių liaudininkų sąjunga/LVLS)
Jan 2012 – Feb 2017: Lithuanian Peasant and Greens Union (Lietuvos valstiečių ir žaliųjų sąjunga/LVŽS)
Feb 2017 – present: Lithuanian Farmers and Greens Union (Lietuvos valstiečių ir žaliųjų sąjunga/LVŽS)

See also
Union of Greens and Farmers (Latvia)

References

External links
 Official English web page

Agrarian parties in Lithuania
Centrist parties in Lithuania
Conservative parties in Lithuania
2006 establishments in Lithuania
Green parties in Europe
Green conservative parties